This is a timeline of women's suffrage in Georgia. Women's suffrage in Georgia started in earnest with the formation of the Georgia Woman Suffrage Association (GWSA) in 1892. GWSA helped bring the first large women's rights convention to the South in 1895 when the National American Woman's Suffrage Association (NAWSA) held their convention in Atlanta. GWSA was the main source of activism behind women's suffrage until 1913. In that year, several other groups formed including the Georgia Young People's Suffrage Association (GYPSA) and the Georgia Men's League for Woman Suffrage. In 1914, the Georgia Association Opposed to Women's Suffrage (GAOWS) was formed by anti-suffragists. Despite the hard work by suffragists in Georgia, the state continued to reject most efforts to pass equal suffrage. In 1917, Waycross, Georgia allowed women to vote in primary elections and in 1919 Atlanta granted the same. Georgia was the first state to reject the Nineteenth Amendment. Women in Georgia still had to wait to vote statewide after the Nineteenth Amendment was ratified on August 26, 1920. Native American and African American women had to wait even longer to vote. Georgia ratified the Nineteenth Amendment in 1970.

19th century

1880s 
1887

 Georgia passes a "cumulative" poll tax, where individuals had to pay all back taxes to the poll in order to vote.

1890s 
1890

 Helen Augusta Howard creates a small women's suffrage organization, the first in Georgia, which would later become the Georgia Woman Suffrage Association (GWSA).

1894

 The Equal Suffrage League of Atlanta forms as a chapter of GWSA.

1895

 January: The National American Woman Suffrage Association (NAWSA) holds their annual convention in Atlanta.
 February 4: Susan B. Anthony speaks at Atlanta University.
 The weekly newspaper, the Sunny South from Atlanta, endorses women's suffrage.
1896

 Mary Latimer McLendon creates the Atlanta chapter of GWSA.

1899

 November: GWSA holds their first convention at Atlanta.

20th century

1900s 
1900

 The Georgia Federation of Labor endorses women's suffrage.
 Georgia creates white primaries.

1901

 November: GWSA holds their annual convention.

1902

 Women in Atlanta petition the local government to vote in municipal elections, but they are rejected.
 November: GWSA holds their annual convention in Atlanta at the Universalist Church.
1903

 GWSA holds the state convention with Kate M. Gordon as a speaker.

1905

 McLendon of the GWSA reaches out to the Georgia chapter of the Women's Christian Temperance Union (WCTU), but they are not interested in adding women's suffrage as a plank.
1906

 The state suffrage convention celebrated the life of Susan B. Anthony.
1907

 The state legislature passes a law that only men of "good character" may vote and all poll taxes must be paid six months in advance of the election.

1908

 Mary Latimer McLendon is invited to speak on women's rights at the Georgia Agricultural Association.
 The Georgia Prohibition Party endorses women's suffrage.

1909

 Women in Atlanta petition for the right to vote in local elections, but their petition is rejected.

1910s 
1913

 The Georgia Woman Equal Suffrage League is created.
 The Georgia Young People's Suffrage Association (GYPSA) is formed.
 The Georgia Men's League for Woman Suffrage is created.
 March 3: Members of GYPSA march in the Woman Suffrage Parade.
 July: The Atlanta Constitution creates a woman suffrage department.
 November: The Student's Club of Columbus sponsors a lecture by Jean Margaret Gordon.
 December: Suffragists enter three cars in the "auto floral parade."
1914

 The Equal Suffrage Party of Georgia is organized.
 The Georgia chapter of WCTU is more open to women's suffrage at their convention.
 Spring: The Georgia Association Opposed to Woman Suffrage is formed.
 March: Women's suffrage rally is held in Atlanta with Jane Addams as a featured speaker.
 May 2: McLendon speaks on the steps of the State Capitol and members of GWSA sell copies of the Woman's Journal.
 June 25: Representative Barry Wright introduces an equal suffrage amendment in the House of the Georgia General Assembly.
 June 30: J. W. Bush introduces a similar measure in the Georgia Senate.
 July: State suffrage convention held at Hotel Ansley.
 December: Suffragists enter the Advertizing Men's Parade, where they win three prizes.
1915

 March: The Atlanta Equal Suffrage Association hosts a suffrage program including a speech by Rebecca Latimer Felton and a showing of Your Girl and Mine.
 August: The Georgia legislature votes against women's suffrage.
 November: State suffrage convention is held in Atlanta.
 November: Suffrage parade is held, with Eleanor Raoul leading on horseback.
 December: Suffrage rally held in Atlanta with Jean Margaret Gordon speaking.
1916

 Equal suffrage measures are introduced in both houses of the Georgia legislature, but do not pass.
 February: Suffragists get 10,000 signers on a petition to the city council of Atlanta to support municipal suffrage.
 October 28: The Equal Suffrage Party of Georgia holds its annual convention in Atlanta.

1917

 Georgia chapter of the National Woman's Party is formed.
 Waycross, Georgia opens municipal primary elections to women.
 July: Women's suffrage is debated in the Georgia legislature, but does not pass.
 November 24: The Equal Suffrage Party of Georgia holds its annual convention in Augusta.

1919

 January 15: The Equal Suffrage Party of Georgia holds its annual convention in Savannah.
 May 3: White women in Atlanta gain the right to vote in municipal primary elections.

1920s 
1920

 March: The Equal Suffrage Party of Georgia dissolves and forms the League of Women Voters (LWV) of Georgia.
 July 24: Georgia is the first state to reject the Nineteenth Amendment.
 September 8: McLendon and other women attempted to vote and to register to vote, but were turned away.
1921

 The Georgia legislature passed a law allowing women to vote and hold public office.

1922

 White Georgia women are able to vote statewide.
1924

 Native American women are granted citizenship.

1950s 
1956

 The Georgia LWV changes their bylaws to allow people of any race to join.

1960s 
1965

 The Voting Rights Act of 1965 removes barriers preventing Black women from voting.

1970s 
1970

 February 20: Georgia ratifies the Nineteenth Amendment.

See also 

 List of Georgia (U.S. state) suffragists
 Women's suffrage in Georgia (U.S. state)
 Women's suffrage in states of the United States
 Women's suffrage in the United States.

References

Sources

External links 

 This day in Georgia history

Georgia (U.S. state) suffrage
Suffrage referendums
American suffragists
History of women in Georgia (U.S. state)
History of African-American civil rights
Timelines of states of the United States